Rolling Mill Historic District is a national historic district located at Cumberland, Allegany County, Maryland.  It is a  primarily residential historic district located on the east side of the city of Cumberland.  It contains a strong, locally distinctive concentration of wood and brick residences built between the early 1870s and the late 1940s. It also includes a modest commercial area.  The district has a total of 173 properties, including the previously listed Francis Haley House.

It was listed on the National Register of Historic Places in 2008.

References

External links

 at Maryland Historical Trust
Boundary Map of the Rolling Mill Historic District, Allegany County, at Maryland Historical Trust

Historic districts on the National Register of Historic Places in Maryland
Historic districts in Allegany County, Maryland
Cumberland, Maryland
National Register of Historic Places in Allegany County, Maryland